Fabric (stylized as fabric) is a nightclub in Farringdon, London, England. Founded in 1999 on Charterhouse Street opposite Smithfield Market, the club was voted World Number 1 Club in DJ Magazine's "Top 100 Clubs Poll" in 2007 and 2008 and ranked World Number 2 in 2009, 2010 and 2017.

Fabric was closed down and its licence was revoked by Islington Council in 2016, after two drug-related deaths at the club. Following a campaign to save the club it was permitted to be reopened with increased security and restrictions.

History 

The club was founded by Keith Reilly and Cameron Leslie and opened on 29 October 1999.

Fabric occupied the renovated space of the Metropolitan Cold Stores. Smithfield Meat Market stands and operates from a site directly opposite. The area's construction took place in Victorian times alongside nearby landmarks Holborn Viaduct and Fleet Valley Bridge.

Fabric has three separate rooms with independent sound systems; two of the rooms feature stages for live acts. A feature of the club is its vibrating floor in Room One: known as a "bodysonic" dancefloor, sections of the floor are attached to 400 bass transducers emitting bass frequencies of the music being played.

In 2010, Fabric briefly went into administration after its sister club Matter, with whom it had a cross-guaranteed loan, announced it would close for the summer due to financial difficulties suffered as a consequence of continued delays with TfL upgrade of the Jubilee Line. Fabric was put on the market on 1 June 2010. On 24 June it was announced Fabric was no longer in administration and had been bought by Fabric Life Limited, "a consortium who fully back [Fabric] founders Keith Reilly and Cameron Leslie's vision."

Style 
The musical genres played at Fabric vary. Friday nights (known as "FABRICLIVE") are dedicated to bass music genres, being mainly drum and bass since its inception. FABRICLIVE also features genres including grime, breakbeat, dubstep and bassline. Saturday nights, (known simply as "Fabric") showcase genres such as house, techno and disco, and feature the club's resident DJs Craig Richards and Terry Francis. Richards was also one of the Directors of Music Programming, selecting the line-ups for Saturday nights, which have featured appearances by DJs such as Ricardo Villalobos, Carl Craig, Ellen Allien, and many others. Sundays at Fabric are promoted by "Wetyourself", a polysexual event that has been running since February 2009. The music policy is underground house and techno, with the occasional live PA.

Other ventures 
A CD series was launched in 2001 under Fabric Records. It rotates monthly between Fabric and FABRICLIVE, with the series showcasing established and emerging DJs. It is entirely independent and operated solely by Fabric. The full list of titles in the series can be seen at Fabric discography.

On 19 September 2008, Reilly and Leslie opened the 2,600-capacity music venue Matter. Located in The O2, it was their first project outside of Fabric. Matter has since closed.

Houndstooth is a record label from Fabric, started in February 2013.

Official closure and reopening 
On 7 September 2016, after a review into the drug-related deaths of two people in the club, Fabric's licence was revoked and it was announced that the venue would be closed permanently. A campaign was launched to secure the club's future, backed and popularised by DJs, musicians, venue-goers and several politicians. London's mayor Sadiq Khan criticised the decision and placed it in the context of the city having lost 50% of its nightclubs since 2008, a "decline [which] must stop if London is to retain its status as a 24-hour city with a world-class nightlife".

Following the closure, supporters of the club launched a social media and crowdfunding campaign supporting reopening the club. Over £200,000 was raised toward a legal fighting fund to appeal the council's decision. In November 2016, news reports stated that the council and the club's management were working on an out of court settlement that might lead to the reopening of the club. On 21 November 2016, Fabric struck a deal with Islington Council, with backing from the Mayor of London, to reopen the club.

Fabric reopened under agreed conditions: a new ID system, covert surveillance system, a lifetime ban for anyone found dealing or in possession of drugs and no one under the age of 19 allowed between Friday 8pm to Monday 8am.

Shortly after these changes were made, it was announced that Fabric would be halving the number of "FABRICLIVE" bass-driven nights, which included their famous Playaz drum and bass residency, which spiked controversy among the respective bass music communities, especially within drum and bass.

In popular culture
The nightclub was used as a filming location for the first season of the BBC America thriller series Killing Eve (2018–present), doubling as a Berlin nightclub in the episode "Don't I Know You?"

Awards and nominations

DJ Magazine's top 100 Clubs

International Dance Music Awards

International Nightlife Association's Top 100 Clubs

See also

List of electronic dance music venues

Notes

References

External links 
 
 
 Fabric Review

Nightclubs in London
Buildings and structures in the London Borough of Islington
Music venues completed in 1999
1999 establishments in England
Tourist attractions in the London Borough of Islington
Electronic dance music venues
Farringdon, London